Recchia albicans is a species of beetle in the family Cerambycidae. It was described by Félix Édouard Guérin-Méneville in 1831.

References

Recchia (beetle)
Beetles described in 1831